Bahmayi-ye Sarhadi-ye Gharbi Rural District is a rural district (dehestan) in Dishmok District, Kohgiluyeh County, Kohgiluyeh and Boyer-Ahmad Province, Iran. At the 2006 census, its population was 7,539, in 1,360 families. The rural district has 29 villages.

References 

Rural Districts of Kohgiluyeh and Boyer-Ahmad Province
Kohgiluyeh County